Longzeyuan Subdistrict is a subdistrict located on the southern side of Changping District, Beijing, China. It shares border with Shigezhuang and Huoying Subdistricts in the north, Huoying Subdistrict in the east, and Huilongguan Subdistrict in the south and west. Its population was 181,906 in the 2020 census.

History

Administrative divisions 

As of 2021, Longzeyuan Subdistrict was composed of 35 subdivisions, with 34 of them being communities, and the other 1 being a village:

See also 

 List of township-level divisions of Beijing

References 

Changping District
Subdistricts of Beijing